Van Loon's law appears to be a poorly attributed statement drawn from a book published in 1929. It may originate in Hendrik Willem van Loon.

"The amount of mechanical development will always be in inverse ratio to the number of slaves that happen to be at a country’s disposal."

Attributed as quoted in: Stuart Chase; Men and Machines; (The Macmillan Company, N. Y.; 1929).

References

External links 
Places which quote this:
 
 

Adages